Apokal is a 1971 West German drama film directed by Paul Anczykowski. It was entered into the 1971 Cannes Film Festival.

Cast
 Christoph Nel as Carmann
 Rotraut de Nève as Catinka
 Heinrich Clasing as Painter
 Dorit Amann as Gala
 Cornelia Niemann as Pila
 Inken Sommer as Lucia
 Tilo Prückner as Miles
 Heinrich Giskes as Ariel
 Ernst Kottenstedte
 Manfred Günther

References

External links
 

1971 films
1971 drama films
West German films
German drama films
1970s German-language films
1970s German films